Bruce Anthony Zimmermann (born February 9, 1995) is an American professional baseball pitcher for the Baltimore Orioles of Major League Baseball (MLB).

Amateur career
Zimmermann graduated from Loyola Blakefield in 2013. Undrafted out of high school in the 2013 Major League Baseball draft, he enrolled at Towson University to play college baseball before transferring to the University of Mount Olive after his sophomore year. In 2017, as a senior at Mount Olive, he was 9–2 with a 3.18 ERA in 15 starts, striking out 129 batters in 99 innings.

Professional career

Atlanta Braves
After Zimmermann's senior year, he was selected by the Atlanta Braves in the fifth round of the 2017 Major League Baseball draft. He signed for $10,000, and was assigned to the Danville Braves, where he was 0–1 with a 3.09 ERA in 11 starts. He began 2018 with the Rome Braves, with whom he was named a South Atlantic League All-Star, before being promoted to the Mississippi Braves in June.

Baltimore Orioles
On July 31, 2018, Zimmermann, Jean Carlos Encarnacion, Brett Cumberland, Evan Phillips and international signing money were traded to the Baltimore Orioles in exchange for Kevin Gausman and Darren O'Day. He was assigned to the Bowie Baysox and finished the season there. In 25 starts between Rome, Mississippi, and Bowie, he compiled an 11–7 record with a 3.21 ERA. He returned to Bowie to begin 2019 before being promoted to the Norfolk Tides in July. Over 25 games (24 starts) between the two clubs, Zimmermann pitched to a 7–6 record with a 3.21 ERA, striking out 134 over 140 innings.

His addition to the Orioles' 60-player Alternate Training Site pool was delayed to August 2020 due to his recovery from COVID-19. Hours after he was added to the team's 40-man roster when his contract was selected by the Orioles, Zimmermann pitched three innings as the starting pitcher in his MLB debut in a 10–6 loss to the Tampa Bay Rays in the second game of a twi-night doubleheader at Camden Yards on September 17, 2020. Zimmermann gave up six earned runs over seven innings pitched in his debut season in 2020.

On August 15, 2021, Zimmermann was placed on the 60-day injured list. Zimmermann had been nearing a return to the team from biceps tendinitis but suffered a sprained right ankle. He was activated from the injured list on September 28.

References

External links

1995 births
Living people
Baseball players from Baltimore
Major League Baseball pitchers
Baltimore Orioles players
Towson Tigers baseball players
Mount Olive Trojans baseball players
Danville Braves players
Rome Braves players
Mississippi Braves players
Bowie Baysox players
Norfolk Tides players